Henry J. Yates (December 7, 1819 – November 24, 1893) was an American politician who served as the Mayor of Newark from 1876 to 1880.

Yates was the son of manufacturer Thomas Yates. He was born in New York and at age 15 began work in Newark for William Rankin & Co. At age 24, he founded a hat company Vail & Yates which lasted until 1857. Later he was part of Yates, Wharton, & Co. also making hats.

In 1874–1875, he represented the Fourth Ward and in 1876 became Mayor.

References

1819 births
1893 deaths
Mayors of Newark, New Jersey
New Jersey Republicans